Gary King may refer to:

Gary King (cricketer) (born 1996), Zimbabwean cricketer
Gary King (director) (born 1972), American director and writer
Gary King (footballer) (born 1990), English footballer
Gary King (political scientist) (born 1958), American political scientist and political methodologist
Gary King (politician) (born 1954), American attorney and politician
Gary King (bass player) (born 1947), American bass player.
Gary King, main character in 2013 film, The World's End, played by Simon Pegg
Gary King (golfer) (born 1990), English professional golfer